Allen Algernon Bathurst, Lord Apsley, DSO, MC, TD, DL (3 August 1895 – 17 December 1942) was a British Army officer and Conservative Party politician.

Early life
Apsley was the eldest son of Seymour Bathurst, 7th Earl Bathurst and his wife Lilias Margaret Frances née Borthwick, daughter of Algernon Borthwick, 1st Baron Glenesk. He was educated at Eton and Christ Church, Oxford, graduating BA hons.

Military career
During World War I, he served overseas with the Royal Gloucestershire Hussars.  He was promoted to temporary lieutenant in April 1916, acting captain in June 1917, receiving a substantive promotion to lieutenant from the same date, and to substantive captain in 1918. He was awarded the Military Cross (MC) and Distinguished Service Order (DSO) for his actions in Egypt:

Political and business career

He was elected as Member of Parliament (MP) for Southampton in 1922, holding the seat until 1929. He then stood for Bristol Central in 1931, and held the seat until his death in 1942.  In 1923 he was appointed a Deputy Lieutenant for the "County of Gloucester, and of the City and County of the City of Gloucester, and the City and County of the City of Bristol."

During this time, he was Parliamentary Private Secretary to: the Under-Secretary of State for the Overseas Trade Department 1922–24, the Minister of Transport 1925-29 and the Minister for Co-ordination Defence 1936. He had also been President of the UK Pilot's Association in 1925 and sometime chairman of Western Airways, Western Air Transport Company and a director of Morning Post.  Lord and Lady Apsley published a book called The Amateur Settlers in 1929 recounting their escapades and adventures travelling through in the Northern Territory of Australia.  They had many encounters, including with local aborigines, in which detailed descriptions reveal their social attitudes and behaviour.

He remained a member of the Territorial Army between the wars, and was awarded the Territorial Decoration (TD) in 1929, promoted to brevet major in 1930, and promoted to substantive major in 1938. During World War II, he served overseas again, with the Arab Legion (1941–42).

Marriage
On 27 February 1924, Lord Apsley had married Viola Meeking (who succeeded him as MP for Bristol Central) and they had two sons: Henry Allen John (1927–2011) and George Bertram (1929–2010). As Lord Apsley predeceased his father, the latter's earldom later passed to Lord Apsley's eldest son, Henry.

Death
Lord Apsley was a passenger on a Handley Page Halifax of No. 138 Squadron RAF when it crashed on take-off from Malta, killing all on board. Apsley was buried with the other victims at Kalkara Naval Cemetery in Kalkara.

References

External links
 Lord Apsley8
 

1895 births
1942 deaths
People educated at Eton College
Conservative Party (UK) MPs for English constituencies
British Army personnel of World War I
Companions of the Distinguished Service Order
Recipients of the Military Cross
UK MPs 1922–1923
UK MPs 1923–1924
UK MPs 1924–1929
UK MPs 1931–1935
UK MPs 1935–1945
Bathurst
Deputy Lieutenants of Gloucestershire
Royal Gloucestershire Hussars officers
Alumni of Christ Church, Oxford
Heirs apparent who never acceded
British courtesy barons and lords of Parliament
Allen
Victims of aviation accidents or incidents in Malta
Royal Armoured Corps officers